Spellbound is a 1945 American psychological thriller film directed by Alfred Hitchcock, and starring Ingrid Bergman, Gregory Peck, and Michael Chekhov. It follows a psychoanalyst who falls in love with the new head of the Vermont hospital in which she works, only to find that he is an imposter suffering dissociative amnesia, and potentially, a murderer. The film is based on the 1927 novel The House of Dr. Edwardes by Hilary Saint George Saunders and John Palmer.

Filming of Spellbound took place in the summer of 1944 in Vermont, Utah, and Los Angeles. Spellbound was released theatrically in New York City on Halloween 1945, after which its U.S. release expanded on December 28, 1945. The film received favorable reviews from critics and was a major box-office success, grossing $6.4 million in the United States, and breaking ticket sales records in London. The film was nominated for six Academy Awards, including for Best Picture and Best Director, and won in the category of Best Original Score.

Plot
Dr. Constance Petersen is a psychoanalyst at a mental hospital in Vermont. The hospital's director, Dr. Murchison, is forced into retirement shortly after returning from an absence due to nervous exhaustion. His replacement, Dr. Anthony Edwardes, turns out to be surprisingly young. Petersen is immediately smitten with him.

They fall in love. One day, while kissing him, Petersen notices that this Edwardes has a peculiar phobia about sets of parallel lines against a white background. She compares his signature with an autographed copy of one of his books, realizing that they do not match and he is an impostor. He confides to her that he has killed the real Edwardes and taken his place. Suffering from amnesia, he does not know who he really is. Petersen believes he is an innocent man with a guilt complex. Overnight, he disappears. At the same time, it becomes public knowledge that the man is an impostor, and that the real Edwardes is missing and may have been killed.

Petersen tracks him down to a New York City hotel, where he is living under the pseudonym John Brown. Despite his insistence for her to leave, she convinces him that psychoanalysis can break through his amnesia and uncover his former memories. The two travel to Rochester, New York, and stay with Dr. Alexander Brulov, Petersen's former mentor.

The two doctors analyze a dream that Brown had. He is playing cards in a mysterious club when a scantily-clad woman resembling Petersen starts kissing everybody there. His card partner, an older man, is accused of cheating and threatened by the club's masked proprietor. The scene changes to the older man standing on the precipice of a sloped roof and falling off. The proprietor is found to be standing behind a chimney and dropping a wheel he held in his hands. Brown's dream concludes with him being chased down a hill by a great pair of wings.

Brown's phobia of dark lines on white turns out to be based on ski tracks in the snow and the older man in his dream is the real Edwardes, who met his demise in a skiing accident. The detail of the wings makes them deduce that it must have been the Gabriel Valley ski lodge. Brown and Petersen travel there to recreate the circumstances of Edwardes' death. However, Brown fears that, if he really was Edwardes' murderer, he may impulsively kill again in the same situation.

As they go down the slope, Brown remembers details of his former life: he has a guilt complex, rooted in a childhood accident where he killed his brother by knocking him onto a spiked fence. He also recognizes the cliff where Edwardes fell off and recalls his real name: John Ballantyne. Petersen and John later meet with the police, who find Edwardes' body with Ballantyne's directions. However, the corpse has a bullet wound in his back. Ballantyne is arrested, tried, and convicted of murder.

Heartbroken, Petersen returns to the hospital. Murchison, once again the director, lets slip that he knew Edwardes slightly and did not like him, contradicting his earlier statement that they had never met. This inspires Petersen to re-examine her notes of Ballantyne's dream: the masked proprietor represents Murchison and the wheel represents a revolver. Murchison therefore murdered Edwardes and left the gun on the ski slope.

Confronting Murchison to prove her hunch, Petersen gets him to admit that the man in the dream likely represents himself. She presents her accusation, and Murchison replies that she got every detail right but one: he still has the revolver, and draws it on her. Deciding to phone the police, Petersen points out that while he could plead insanity and get a lesser charge for Edwardes' murder, shooting her would guarantee his execution. She leaves the office, and Murchison turns the gun on himself.

In the final scene, Petersen and Ballantyne, now married, receive well-wishes from Dr. Brulov before departing on their honeymoon at Grand Central Terminal.

Cast

Production

Development 
Spellbound was made over contract disagreements between Alfred Hitchcock and producer David O. Selznick. Hitchcock's contract with Selznick began in March 1939, but only resulted in three films: Spellbound, Rebecca (1940) and The Paradine Case (1947). (Notorious was sold to RKO in mid-production.) Selznick had wanted Hitchcock to make a film based upon Selznick's own positive experience with psychoanalysis; Selznick, at Hitchcock's suggestion, purchased the rights to the 1927 novel The House of Dr. Edwardes by Hilary St. George Saunders and John Palmer (who had co-written it under the pseudonym Francis Beeding), for approximately $40,000.

In December 1943, Hitchcock and his wife, Alma Reville, began working on a treatment of the novel, and consulted prominent British psychologists and psychoanalysts so as to accurately represent the psychological elements of the story. However, the following month, in January 1944, Hitchcock hired Angus MacPhail, with whom he had collaborated on several war-related short films, to co-author the treatment. MacPhail was ultimately given the adaptation credit, and the extent to which Reville was involved in the final product is unknown. Following the completion of the treatment, screenwriter Ben Hecht began writing the screenplay.

Between May and July 1944, Selznick submitted numerous drafts of Hecht's screenplay for approval from the Motion Picture Association of America (MPAA), who objected to various words and phrases in it, including "sex menace," "frustrations," "libido," and "tomcat." This resulted in some alterations in the screenplay, including the removal of most of a character named Mary Carmichael, a violent nymphomaniac at Green Manors. However, the suicide of Dr. Murchison in the screenplay—which typically violated the MPAA's rules against depicting suicide—was allowed to remain, as it was reasoned by Selznick that the character was clearly "of unsound mind," rendering him an exception.

Casting
Selznick originally wanted Joseph Cotten, Dorothy McGuire, and Paul Lukas to play the roles ultimately portrayed by Peck, Bergman, and Chekhov, respectively.  Greta Garbo was considered for the role of Dr. Constance Petersen.  Hitchcock wanted Joseph Cotten to portray Dr. Murchison. Selznick also wanted Jennifer Jones to portray Dr. Petersen but Hitchcock objected.

Filming
Selznick brought in his own therapist, May Romm, MD, to serve as a technical advisor on the production. Dr. Romm and Hitchcock clashed frequently.

Further contention was caused by the hiring of surrealist artist Salvador Dalí to conceive certain scenes in the film's key dream sequence. However, the sequence conceived and designed by Dalí and Hitchcock, once translated to film, proved to be too lengthy and complicated for Selznick, so the vast majority of what had been filmed ultimately was edited out. Two minutes of the dream sequence appear in the final film, but according to Ingrid Bergman, the original had been twenty minutes long. The cut footage apparently is now considered lost footage, although some production stills have survived in the Selznick archives. Eventually, Selznick hired William Cameron Menzies, who had worked on Gone With the Wind, to oversee the set designs and direct the sequence.  Hitchcock himself had very little to do with its actual filming.

Both Bergman and Peck were married to others at the time of production—Bergman to Petter Aron Lindström, and Peck to Greta Kukkonen—but they had a brief affair during filming. Their secret relationship became public knowledge when Peck confessed to Brad Darrach of People in an interview in 1987, five years after Bergman's death. "All I can say is that I had a fiery kinda love for her, and I think that’s where I ought to stop… I was young. She was young. We were involved for weeks in close and intense work."

Hitchcock's cameo appearance in the film occurs approximately at the forty-minute mark, when he can be seen exiting an elevator at the Empire State Hotel, carrying a violin case and smoking a cigarette. The trailer for Spellbounds original theatrical release in America made a great deal of fuss over this cameo of Hitchcock's, showing the footage twice and even freeze-framing Hitchcock's brief appearance while a breathless narrator informs us that this ordinary-looking man is, in fact, Hitchcock himself.
 
Spellbound was shot in black and white, except for two frames of bright red at the conclusion, when Dr. Murchison's gun is fired into the camera. This detail was deleted in most 16mm and video formats but was restored for the film's DVD release and airings on Turner Classic Movies.

Parts of the film were shot in Alta, Utah at the Alta Lodge and Wasatch Ranch. The film's picnic sequence between Peck and Bergmans' characters was filmed at the Cooper Ranch in Northridge, Los Angeles, while other sequences—such as the train depot scene—were filmed on the Universal Studios lot.

Music
The film features an orchestral score by Miklós Rózsa that  pioneered the use of the theremin, performed by Dr. Samuel Hoffmann. Selznick originally wanted Bernard Herrmann, but when Herrmann became unavailable, Rózsa was hired and eventually won the Oscar for his score. Although Rózsa considered Spellbound to contain some of his best work, he said "Alfred Hitchcock didn't like the music — said it got in the way of his direction. I haven't seen him since." During the film's protracted post-production, considerable disagreement arose about the music, exacerbated by a lack of communication between producer, director, and composer. Rózsa had scored another film, The Lost Weekend, before Spellbound was released and had used the theremin in that score as well. This led to allegations that he had recycled music from Selznick's film in the Paramount production. Meanwhile, Selznick's assistant tampered with the Spellbound scoring by replacing some of Rózsa's material with earlier music by Franz Waxman and Roy Webb. The tangled history of the scoring process has been explored by Jack Sullivan (Hitchcock's Music, 2006) and especially Nathan Platte (Making Music in Selznick's Hollywood, 2018), both of which qualify and sometimes contradict the early accounts of the participants.

Rózsa's music achieved great popularity outside the film. Selznick's innovative use of promotional recordings for radio broadcast made the themes familiar and eventually inspired Rózsa to prepare a full-scale Spellbound Concerto for piano, theremin, and orchestra. This work became a popular staple in the movie concerto genre and has received multiple recordings.  Intrada Records made the first recording of the film's complete score with the Slovak Radio Symphony Orchestra. This album also included music not heard in the finished film.

Production credits
The production credits on the film were as follows:
 Director – Alfred Hitchcock 
 Producer – David O. Selznick 
 Writing – Ben Hecht (screenplay), Angus MacPhail (adaptation)
 Cinematography – George Barnes (director of photography)
 Music – Miklós Rózsa 
 Art direction – James Basevi (art director), John Ewing (associate art director), Emile Kuri (interior decoration)
 Film editing – Hal C. Kern (supervising film editor), William H. Ziegler (associate film editor)
 Production assistant – Barbara Keon
 Special effects – Jack Cosgrove – special effects
 Assistant director – Lowell J. Farrell
 Sound – Richard DeWeese (recorder)
 Design of dream sequence – Salvador Dalí
 Psychiatric advisor – May E. Romm, M.D.

Release

Box office
Spellbound opened theatrically in New York City on Halloween 1945, and the following week in Los Angeles, on November 8, 1945. It was subsequently given a wide release in the United States on December 28, 1945. It earned rentals of $4,975,000 in North America.

Upon the film's British release, it broke every box office record in London, in both famous theaters, Pavilion and Tivoli Strand, for a single day, week, month, holiday and Sundays.

Critical response
Newsweek's review evaluated the film as "a superior and suspenseful melodrama;" Bosley Crowther of The New York Times wrote that the story was "a rather obvious and often-told tale ... but the manner and quality of its telling is extraordinarily fine ... the firm texture of the narration, the flow of continuity and dialogue, the shock of the unexpected, the scope of image—all are happily here." Variety wrote that Bergman gave a "beautiful characterization" and that Peck "handles the suspense scenes with great skill and has one of his finest screen roles to date." Harrison's Reports wrote: "Very good! ... The performances of the entire cast are superior, and throughout the action an overtone of suspense and terror, tinged with touches of deep human interest and appealing romance, is sustained." John McCarten of The New Yorker wrote that "when the film stops trying to be esoteric and abandons arcane mumbling for good, rousing melodrama, it moves along in the manner to which Hitchcock has accustomed us ... Fortunately, the English expert hasn't forgotten any of his tricks. He still has a nice regard for supplementary characters, and he uses everything from train whistles to grand orchestral crescendos to maintain excitement at a shrill pitch ... All in all, you'd better see this one."

Spellbound placed fifth on Film Daily'''s annual poll of 559 critics across the United States naming the best films of the year.

Rotten Tomatoes rates the film 85% fresh, based on 40 reviews. Its critical consensus says: “Spellbound's exploration of the subconscious could have benefitted from more analysis, but Alfred Hitchcock's psychedelic flourishes elevate this heady thriller along with Ingrid Bergman and Gregory Peck's star power”.

On September 28, 2018, Jake Wilson of The Age put Spellbound on his “top five” list, observing: “Today this seems above all a forward-thinking portrait of a woman battling for authority in a man's world.”

Accolades

Home media
In 1999, Anchor Bay Entertainment released Spellbound for the first time on DVD.  The Criterion Collection subsequently issued a DVD release in 2002. In 2012, MGM Home Entertainment released the film on Blu-ray.

Radio adaptationsSpellbound was performed as a one-hour radio adaptation on Lux Radio Theatre on March 8, 1948. On January 25, 1951 Screen Directors Playhouse'' also did a one-hour adaptation. Both versions starred Joseph Cotten.

Legacy
Rózsa's score inspired Jerry Goldsmith to become a film composer.

See also
 Dissociative amnesia
 List of American films of 1945
 Mental illness in films

References

Sources

External links

 
 
 
  Music to the film arranged by Rózsa
 Spellbound on Lux Radio Theater: March 8, 1948
 Photos of Ingrid Bergman in Spellbound by Ned Scott
 Photos of Rhonda Fleming in Spellbound by Ned Scott
Selznick International’s Spellbound an essay by Leonard Leff at the Criterion Collection
Spellbound: Love and Psychoanalysis an essay by Lesley Brill at the Criterion Collection

1945 films
1940s mystery thriller films
1940s psychological thriller films
1940s romance films
American black-and-white films
American mystery thriller films
American psychological thriller films
Film noir
Films about amnesia
Films about psychoanalysis
Films based on British novels
Films directed by Alfred Hitchcock
Films about hypnosis
Films produced by David O. Selznick
Films scored by Miklós Rózsa
Films set in New York (state)
Films set in psychiatric hospitals
Films set in Vermont
Films shot in Utah
Films that won the Best Original Score Academy Award
Salvador Dalí
Films with screenplays by Ben Hecht
Selznick International Pictures films
United Artists films
1940s English-language films
1940s American films
Films about disability